Kalwa may refer to:
Kalwa, Thane, India
Kalwa railway station, Thane
Kalwa, Rajasthan, India
Kalwa, Pomeranian Voivodeship (north Poland)
Kalwa, Warmian-Masurian Voivodeship (north Poland)